Dorri Abdel Kader El-Said (31 January 1927 – January 2015) was an Egyptian swimmer and water polo player. He competed at the 1948 Summer Olympics, 1952 Summer Olympics and the 1960 Summer Olympics.

See also
 Egypt men's Olympic water polo team records and statistics

References

External links
 

1927 births
2015 deaths
Egyptian male swimmers
Egyptian male water polo players
Olympic swimmers of Egypt
Olympic water polo players of Egypt
Swimmers at the 1948 Summer Olympics
Swimmers at the 1952 Summer Olympics
Water polo players at the 1948 Summer Olympics
Water polo players at the 1952 Summer Olympics
Water polo players at the 1960 Summer Olympics
Sportspeople from Cairo
20th-century Egyptian people